Imre Komora (born 5 June 1940) is a former Hungarian footballer.

During his club career he played for Budapest Honvéd FC. For the Hungary national football team, he participated in the 1964 European Nations' Cup. He also won a gold medal in football at the 1964 Summer Olympics.

Later he served as the head coach of the Hungarian national team in 1986. As a coach, he won winning three consecutive championship titles with Honvéd, as well as the Hungarian Cup in 1985. He was the father-in-law of Lajos Détári who was once married to Komora's daughter.

References
Profile

1940 births
Living people
Hungarian footballers
Hungary international footballers
Olympic footballers of Hungary
Olympic gold medalists for Hungary
Olympic medalists in football
Footballers at the 1964 Summer Olympics
Medalists at the 1964 Summer Olympics
1964 European Nations' Cup players
Budapest Honvéd FC players
Budapest Honvéd FC managers
Hungarian football managers
Hungary national football team managers
Footballers from Budapest
Association football midfielders
Nemzeti Bajnokság I managers